Black garlic is a type of aged garlic that is colored deep brownish-black. The process is of East Asian origin. It is made by placing garlic (Allium sativum) in a warm, moist, controlled environment over the course of several weeks, a process that produces black cloves. Black garlic is used in a wide variety of culinary applications.

Production
No additives or preservatives are used and there is no burning of any kind. The enzymes that give fresh garlic its sharpness break down. The cloves turn black and develop a sticky date-like texture.

Bacterial endophytes capable of fermentation and with strong heat resistance have been identified in common garlic and black garlic. These may have relevance in black garlic production.

Flavor profile

In black garlic, the distinct pungency of fresh garlic is softened such that it almost or entirely disappears, and the garlic develops notes of licorice, tamarind and caramel. Its flavor is dependent on that of the fresh garlic that was used to make it. Garlic with a higher sugar content produces a milder, more caramel-like flavor, whereas garlic with a low sugar content produces a sharper, somewhat more acidic flavor. Burnt flavors may also be present if the garlic was heated for too long at too high a temperature or not long enough: during heating, the garlic turns black in color well before the full extent of its sweetness is able to develop. Black garlic's softness increases with water content.

Culinary uses
Black garlic can be used alone, on bread, with cheese, red wine or dark chocolate, in soups or sauces, with meat or fish, crushed into mayonnaise, added to a vinaigrette, or with a vegetable dish. The cloves may also be crushed and then water added to create a paste or liquid.

In popular culture
It gained USA television attention when it was used in battle redfish on Iron Chef America, episode 11, season 7 (on Food Network), and in an episode of Top Chef New York (on Bravo), where it was added to a sauce accompanying monkfish, tilefish, risotto or chicken.

In the United Kingdom, where it made its TV debut on the BBC's Something for the Weekend cooking and lifestyle program in February 2009, farmer Mark Botwright, owner of the South West Garlic Farm, claimed to have developed a process for preserving garlic after finding a 4000-year-old Korean recipe for "black garlic".

See also

References

Garlic
Korean cuisine